Bucksville may refer to:

Bucksville, South Carolina
Bucksville, Pennsylvania
Gasper, Kentucky, formerly known as Bucksville
Bucksville (film), a 2011 independent film directed by Chel White

See also
Buckville